Palestine Brigade may refer to:

Palestine Brigade RAF, a World War I Royal Air Force formation which saw action against the Ottoman Empire in Palestine
Jewish Brigade, a World War II British Army formation